The 16th Central American and Caribbean Age Group Championships in Athletics (Spanish: Campeonato Centroamericano y del Caribe Infantil de Pruebas Combinadas), were hosted by the National Association of Athletics Administrations of Trinidad & Tobago (NAAATT), and were held at Hasely Crawford Stadium in Port of Spain, Trinidad and Tobago, between July 18–19, 2015.

Medal summary
Complete results were published.

Team trophies

Medal table (unofficial)

Participation
According to an unofficial count, 103 athletes from 16 countries participated.

References

Central American and Caribbean Age Group Championships in Athletics
International athletics competitions hosted by Trinidad and Tobago
Central American and Caribbean Age Group Championships in Athletics
Central American and Caribbean Age Group Championships in Athletics
Central American and Caribbean Age Group Championships in Athletics
2015 in youth sport